Mikhail Alexeyevich Miropiev() was a Russian Orthodox Missionary who worked in the Caucasus in the late 19th century and early 20th century. At the turn of the 20th century he was the director of the Caucasus Teacher's Seminary, later he worked as the Inspector of Orenburg Educational Region (inspector Orenburgskogo uchbnogo okruga). He wrote numerous works concerning Islam and conversion of Russian Muslims to the Russian Orthodox faith.

References 

Christian missionaries in Russia
History of the Caucasus under the Russian Empire
Eastern Orthodox missionaries
Year of death missing
Year of birth missing
Transcaucasian Teachers Seminary alumni